Vladimir Abramovich Rapoport (6 November 1907, Vitebsk – 17 June 1975, Moscow) was a Soviet cinematographer. Vladimir Rapoport received the Stalin Prize four times: in 1942, 1946, 1949, 1951 and the USSR State Prize in 1971.

Selected filmography
Golden Mountains (1931)
Counterplan (1932)
Girl Friends (1936)
Large Wings (1937)
Frontier (1938)
Friends (1938)
She Defends the Motherland (1943)
Sons (1946)
A New Home (1947)
The Young Guard (1948)
The New China (1950)
The Country Doctor (1951)
Wolves and Sheep (1952)
Vassa Zheleznova (1953)
Barbarians (1953)
Least We Forget (1954)
To a New Shore (1955)
And Quiet Flows the Don (1957–1958)
Leon Gaross Looks for a Friend (1961)
Men and Beasts (1962)
Comrade Arseni (1965)
The Journalist (1967)
A Village Detective (1968)
By the Lake (1969)
The Love of Mankind (1973)
Mothers and Daughters (1974)
Aniskin and Fantomas (1974)

External links
 

Soviet cinematographers
Recipients of the USSR State Prize
Stalin Prize winners
1907 births
1975 deaths